Stray is a novel by A. N. Wilson. It is a precursor to his picture book The Tabitha Stories, as it follows the life of Tabitha's father. The book was published in Great Britain in 1987, by Walker Books and was re-published in the United States by Orchard Books in 1989. Stray is dedicated to "A.L.R," who "reserved his kindest comments for a cat."

Plot summary
A cat named "Pufftail" (he says that he truly has no name) tells his life story to his daughter Tabitha and his grandson. He tells of his life on the streets, in a pet shop, at a convent, with a kind grandmother, and with the cruel "June and Jim," among others and says that he has three tragic parts in his life.

In chronological order, the most important events of Pufftail's life are:

 Being born
 Separated from his mum with his brother 
 Being taken to a pet shop
 Being taken in by Grandma Harris, until she dies
 Being taken in by June and Jim Harbottle
 The death of his brother
 Being taken in by a convent of nuns
 Joining the gang called "The Commune"
 Being used to test a shampoo
 Meeting his "wife"
 The birth of his children
 The death of his "wife"
 Meeting his daughter, Tabitha
 The birth of his grandchildren

1987 British novels
Novels by A. N. Wilson
English novels
Novels about cats
Walker Books books